The Prix Iris for Revelation of the Year is an annual award, presented by Québec Cinéma as part of its Prix Iris program, to honour the best performances by emerging actors in their first major film roles who were not nominated in the main lead and supporting acting categories. The award is not separated by gender.

2010s

2020s

References

Awards established in 2017
Revelation
Quebec-related lists
Awards for young actors